Krasnoyarovo is a rural locality (a selo) in Ivolginsky District, Republic of Buryatia, Russia. The population was 426 as of 2010. There are 6 streets.

Geography 
Krasnoyarovo is located 6 km north of Ivolginsk (the district's administrative centre) by road. Ivolginsk is the nearest rural locality.

References 

Rural localities in Ivolginsky District